Project 1252 'Izmrud' (NATO reporting name: Zhenya class) were a group of three minesweepers built for the Soviet Navy in the late 1960s. The ships were a glass-reinforced plastic (GRP)-hulled version of the preceding wooden-hulled . They were intended to be a prototype of an advanced design, instead the Soviet Navy returned to wooden-hulled minesweeper construction with the following . Of the three minesweepers, one was lost in an explosion in 1989 and the fate of the other two is unknown.

Description and design
The minesweepers of Project 1252 'Izmrud' (NATO reporting name: Zhenya class) were a GRP-hulled trial version based on the preceding wooden-hulled . The vessels were powered by two diesel engines each turning a propeller shaft creating .

The vessels were armed with twin-mounted /65 calibre guns. They also carried six naval mines. The Zhenya class was equipped with "Spin Through" and "Don I" surface search radar and "Two Square Head" identification friend or foe. They had a complement of 40.

Construction and career
The design was accepted for construction in 1961 and three vessels were built by Izhora rated by the Soviet Navy as bazovy tralshchik (base minesweeper). The first vessel to complete in 1966, Komsomelets Turkmenii, was to be the prototype for an advanced coastal minesweeper design. Komsomolets Buryatii followed in 1968 and BT-177 in 1969. Komsomelets Turkmenii was lost in an explosion on 19 August 1989. Komsomolets Buryatii was renamed BT-215 on 18 March 1992. The final fate of the remaining ships is unknown.

See also
 List of ships of the Soviet Navy
 List of ships of Russia by project number

Notelist

Citations

References

External links
  All Zhenya Class Minesweepers - Complete Ship List

Mine warfare vessel classes
Minesweepers of the Soviet Navy